Route 361 is a 20 km north–south regional road in Quebec, Canada, linking Batiscan and St-Narcisse, following the Batiscan river until Ste-Geneviève-de-Batiscan, the only village it goes through.

This road connects with Autoroute 40 at exit 229.

Municipalities along Route 361

 Batiscan
 Sainte-Genevieve-de-Batiscan
 Saint-Narcisse

Major intersections

See also
 List of Quebec provincial highways

References

External links  
 Provincial Route Map (Courtesy of the Quebec Ministry of Transportation) 
 Route 361 on Google Maps

361